Chilli Willi and the Red Hot Peppers were one of the main British pub rock groups of the early 1970s. Later managed by Jake Riviera, who first worked for the band as a roadie, they reached their peak as part of the "Naughty Rhythms Tour" of 1975, along with other stalwarts of the same scene, Dr. Feelgood and Kokomo, each band alternately headlining on different dates.

History
The band has its origins in a folk-rock duo formed by ex-Junior's Blues Band members Martin Stone and Philip C. Lithman. Lithman moved to San Mateo in 1971 to work with a precursor to The Residents, leaving Stone to play with Savoy Brown and Mighty Baby. The duo reunited in 1972 and recorded Kings of the Robot Rhythm that same year with vocalist Jo Ann Kelly and various members of Brinsley Schwarz. That same year, the duo expanded, adding Paul "Dice Man" Bailey, Paul "Bassman" Riley, and Pete Thomas to the line-up.

During the next two years, Chilli Willi & The Red Hot Peppers became a popular live act in Britain, and recorded two John Peel Sessions for BBC Radio 1, on 9 April 1973 and 25 July 1974. In 1974, they released their final album, Bongos Over Balham, which sold poorly; the band split in 1975.

After the band's breakup, Thomas became the drummer for Elvis Costello's backing band, The Attractions; Riley played with Graham Parker; Bailey formed Bontemps Roulez; and Stone played with the Pink Fairies, before concentrating on his book business but has since played with Wreckless Eric. Lithman moved to San Francisco where he began to work with the now fully formed Residents starting from their third album Fingerprince, under the name Snakefinger.

Discography

Albums
Kings of the Robot Rhythm (Revelation, 1972)
Bongos Over Balham (Mooncrest, 1974)
I'll Be Home (Proper, 1996) - compilation
Real Sharp (The Last Music Company, 2017)

Live
The Amazing ZigZag Concert (2010) Road Goes on Forever (RGF/ZZBOX1974) Disc 2 of 5-CD Box set also featuring Starry Eyed and Laughing, Help Yourself, John Stewart and Michael Nesmith

Singles
"Breathe a Little" (Mooncrest, 1975)

References

Other sources
 Vladimir Bogdanov, Chris Woodstra, All Music Guide to Country: The Definitive Guide to Country Music - Page 143, 2003, Backbeat Books, 
 Peter Buckley, The Rough Guide to Rock - Page 465, 2003, Rough Guides, 

English rock music groups
Musical groups from London
British blues musical groups
British rhythm and blues musical groups
British pub rock music groups
Musical groups established in 1971
Musical groups disestablished in 1975
Proper Records artists